African walnut is a common name for several African plants and may refer to:

Coula edulis, in the family Olacaceae
Lovoa trichilioides, in the family Meliaceae
Plukenetia conophora, in the family Euphorbiaceae
Schotia brachypetala, in the family Fabaceae